Smestow may refer to:

Smestow Academy, a school in Wolverhampton, England
Smestow Valley Leisure Ride
Smestow Brook, a tributary of the River Stour